Viard may refer to:

 Viard or Guido (12-13th century), the founder of the Valliscaulian Order
 Karin Viard (born 1966), French actress
 Philippe Viard (1809-1872) bishop, New Zealand
 Virginie Viard (born 1962), French fashion designer, creative director of Chanel
 Bishop Viard College or Viard College, a coeducational secondary school in New Zealand
 Anne-Laure Viard (born 1981), French Olympic canoer
 André Viard (1759-1834), French culinary writer, author of Le Cuisinier Impérial = Le Cuisinier Royal = Le Cuisinier National
 Viard (later Porirua Viard) was a New Zealand association football club (-1983), now amalgamated into Western Suburbs FC